Maurice Alpheus Bigelow (1872-1955) was an American social hygienist, early sex-educator and eugenist. He received his Ph.D. from Harvard University in 1901. He served as president of the American Eugenics Society from 1940 until 1945, as director of the School of Practical Arts at Columbia University Teacher’s College and was affiliated with the American Federation for Sex Hygiene.

His mother was Hattie R. Bigelow (July 5, 1852 – June 27, 1937), and his father was Alpheus Bigelow.

See also 

 Social hygiene movement
 Robert Latou Dickinson

References

External links
 
 

1872 births
1955 deaths
American sex educators
Harvard University alumni